N'Toba is a village and seat of the commune of Koulangougou in the Cercle of Ségou in the Ségou Region of southern-central Mali.

References

Communes of Ségou Region